(Shooting stars), WAB 73, is a song, which Anton Bruckner composed for his own men's voice quartet in  during his stay in the Sankt Florian.

History 

He dedicated it to his own men's voice quartet, which was composed of Ludwig Ehrenecker, Franz Schäfler, Johann Nepomuk Hueber and himself. It is not known when the piece was first performed.

The original manuscript is stored in the archive of the St. Florian Abbey.
The piece was first published in band II/2, pp. 94-96 of the Göllerich/Auer biography. It was thereafter issued in 1954, together with Ständchen, in the Chorblattreihe of Robitschek, Vienna. 

Text 

Sternschnuppen is using a text by Ernst Marinelli.

Music 
The 38-bar long work in F major is scored for  quartet. In the Göllerich/Auer biography the song is described as follows:  (On the whole piece rests the softish romanticism of the at that time popular men's choir-music).

Discography 
A selection among the few recordings of Sternschnuppen:
 Guido Mancusi, Chorus Viennensis, Musik, du himmlisches Gebilde! – CD: ORF CD 73, 1995
 Hubert Voigt, Thüringer Männerchor Ars Musica, Weltliches und Geistliches – CD issued by the choir, 2012 live

References

Sources 
 August Göllerich, Anton Bruckner. Ein Lebens- und Schaffens-Bild,  – posthumous edited by Max Auer by G. Bosse, Regensburg, 1932
 Anton Bruckner – Sämtliche Werke, Band XXIII/2:  Weltliche Chorwerke (1843–1893), Musikwissenschaftlicher Verlag der Internationalen Bruckner-Gesellschaft, Angela Pachovsky and Anton Reinthaler (Editor), Vienna, 1989
 Cornelis van Zwol, Anton Bruckner 1824–1896 – Leven en werken, uitg. Thoth, Bussum, Netherlands, 2012. 
 Uwe Harten, Anton Bruckner. Ein Handbuch. , Salzburg, 1996. .
 Crawford Howie, Anton Bruckner - A documentary biography, online revised edition

External links 
 
 Sternschnuppen F-Dur, WAB 85 – Critical discography by Hans Roelofs 
 Live performances of Sternschnuppen can be heard on YouTube: 
 the Wagner Society Male Choir of Japan, 11 December 1988: Sternschnuppen
 the Schwuler Männerchor Zürich, 2015: Sternschnuppen

Weltliche Chorwerke by Anton Bruckner
1848 compositions
Compositions in F major